Gerald McCullouch (born March 30, 1967) is an American actor and filmmaker. He is best known for playing Bobby Dawson on CSI: Crime Scene Investigation.

Biography

Early life
McCullouch, an Irish-American, was born in Huntsville, Alabama. He got his first professional performing job at 16 as a singer in the country western revue at Six Flags Over Georgia. 
He declined a scholarship to Savannah College of Art and Design to study in the BFA Musical Theatre Program at Florida State University. After surviving a near fatal car crash during his second year, which left him in a coma, he began his career in Atlanta, Georgia.

Acting career
McCullouch is a recurring guest host of FYE! on E! TV airing in nearly 500 million homes worldwide. His performance in Pirates of Silicon Valley, received a mention in the Daily Variety. He also played Jesus in the European tour of Jesus Christ Superstar. He has appeared in numerous commercials and print campaigns – having billboards in Times Square and on Sunset Boulevard and has performed stand up at LA's world-famous Improv. As a director/writer his Award-winning short film The Moment After has received critical acclaim and festival screenings worldwide. McCullouch has been in many publications, including the New York Daily News, Los Angeles Daily News, Jezebel, The Advocate, and the Instinct.

He was on the Law & Order: Special Victims Unit episode "Quickie", which aired on January 6, 2010. He portrayed a father of a teenage girl who died.

He also appears as Roger in the films BearCity, BearCity 2: The Proposal and BearCity 3.
He guest starred in the Trust Your Gut episode of Chicago Med as Don Adams, and in The Ghost in the Machine episode of Bones as Trevor Gibson and with Amber Tamblyn in the Last Temptation episode of House M.D.

In 2018, he appeared Off-Broadway in Perfect Crime  at The Theater Center and in MsTrial at New World Stages in 2020.

In 2021, he appeared in Miami New Drama’s experimental theatre production based on 7 Deadly Sins, in Kaufman’s All I Want is Everything, in the role of Leo.

Directing
McCullouch's feature debut as a director, Daddy, was released in 2015. A film which he also starred in. It is an adaptation of Dan Via's stage play of the same name, in which he had also appeared in both the NY and LA productions.

He directed the documentary All Male, All Nude and its followup All Male, All Nude: Johnsons, which explore two different male strip clubs in Georgia and Florida, respectively.

He is currently working on another documentary,  Stuck in Greece, about LGBT refugees in Greece.

He also previously directed the short film The Moment After.

Filmography

Personal life
In January 2009, McCullouch was on the New York City subway when a man attempted to steal his laptop; McCullouch, a trained boxer, successfully fought him off, even when the thief attempted to stab him with a kitchen knife. The thief was arrested by New York City police officers. He had previously been robbed at gunpoint in Atlanta in 2001.

McCullouch is gay and has directed and starred in several gay-themed productions. He previously dated professional basketball player Derrick Gordon. He was listed as one of the most compelling people of the year by Out in their OUT 100 alongside Ricky Martin, Alan Cumming, Rachel Maddow and others and won the Independent Series Best Supporting Actor Award for his appearances in the web series Hustling.

References

External links
Official Website

1967 births
Living people
American male film actors
American male screenwriters
American male singers
American male soap opera actors
American male television actors
Florida State University alumni
American people of Irish descent
Actors from Huntsville, Alabama
American gay actors
LGBT film directors
LGBT people from Alabama
Male actors from Alabama
Screenwriters from Alabama
Film directors from Alabama